Nima Kulkarni is an American immigration attorney and a Democratic member of the Kentucky House of Representatives representing District 40 since January 2019. In 2018, Kulkarni defeated incumbent Dennis Horlander in the Democratic Primary. She went on to win the general election. Kulkarni is the first Indian-American elected as a state representative in Kentucky.

Early life and education 
Kulkarni was born in India and moved to the United States at the age of six. Her parents, Suhas and Surekha, sought to provide better educational opportunities for their two children, Nima and Nikhil. Kulkarni was educated in the Jefferson County Public School system. She received her bachelor's degree in English Literature at the University of Louisville, where she later earned her Master's of Business Administration in Entrepreneurship as well. She earned her Juris Doctor at the University of the District of Columbia David A. Clarke School of Law.

Legal career and community involvement 
Kulkarni founded the Indus Law Firm in 2010 which specializes in immigration and employment law. In 2013, the firm was honored by Business First in its 40 Under 40 List.

Additionally, Kulkarni is the founder of the New Americans Initiative, a nonprofit operating in Louisville, which seeks to educate and assist Kentucky's immigrant population.

Political career 
Kulkarni first campaigned to represent Kentucky's District 40 in the Kentucky House of Representatives in 2018. Her platform focused on raising the minimum wage, stimulating the economy while maintaining employee pensions, improving immigration policies, supporting the education system, and providing healthcare to all Kentuckians. She defeated the incumbent challenger, Dennis Horlander, in the Democratic primaries and went on to secure the elected position.

While in office, Kulkarni has sponsored legislation related to higher wages, improving healthcare coverage, police reform, and education. She also proposed a bill in 2020 with the goal of providing improved protections to victims of domestic or sexual assault.

Electoral history

References

External links 
 Official page at the Kentucky General Assembly

Place of birth missing (living people)
Living people
American politicians of Indian descent
Democratic Party members of the Kentucky House of Representatives
Asian-American people in Kentucky politics
Politicians from Louisville, Kentucky
21st-century American politicians
Year of birth missing (living people)